Herlong may refer to:

 Herlong (surname)
 Herlong, California, a small town in the United States

See also
 Herlong Junction, California, unincorporated community
 Herlong Recreational Airport